Daniel Chipman (October 22, 1765April 23, 1850) was an American politician. He served as a United States representative from Vermont.

Biography
Chipman was born in Salisbury in the Connecticut Colony to Samuel and Hannah Austin Chipman. He graduated from Dartmouth College in 1788.
He studied law and was admitted to the bar. He began the practice of law in Rutland, Vermont, and practiced law there from 1790 until 1794. Chipman was a member of the state constitutional conventions in 1793, 1814, 1836, 1843, and 1850. He moved to Middlebury, Vermont in 1794.  Among the law students who became attorneys after studying in Chipman's office was Charles Davis, who later served on the Vermont Supreme Court.

Chipman served as a member of the Vermont House of Representatives from 1798 to 1808, 1812 to 1814, 1818 and 1821. He was named a Charter Trustee of Middlebury College, and served in that position until his resignation in 1844. He served as Speaker of the Vermont House of Representatives during the sessions of 1813 and 1814. From 1806 until 1818 he was a professor of law at Middlebury College. In 1848 he received an honorary LL.D from Middlebury College. He was a member of the Governor’s council in 1808.  In 1812 he was elected a Fellow of the American Academy of Arts and Sciences.

He was elected as a Federalist Party candidate to the Fourteenth United States Congress, serving from March 4, 1815 until his resignation on May 5, 1816. In 1824 he was appointed reporter of the superior court. He moved to Ripton, Vermont in 1828 and continued the practice of law, and engaged in literary pursuits.

Family life
Chipman married Eleutheria Hedge Chipman in 1796. They had four children together, Austin Chipman, Sarah White Chipman, Susan Hedge Chipman and Mary Chipman.  Chipman's daughter Sarah was the wife of Charles Linsley.

Chipman wrote a biography of his brother Nathaniel Chipman, a United States senator from Vermont, the first federal judge in Vermont, and, during the latter part of Vermont's years as an independent country, Chief Justice of Vermont. His brother Lemuel Chipman served in the New York State Assembly and the New York State Senate.

Death and legacy
Chipman died on April 23, 1850 in Ripton, Vermont. He is interred at West Cemetery in Middlebury, Vermont.

Chipman Hill in Middlebury is named for him.

Published works
 “Life of Nathaniel Chipman”
 “Memoirs of Thomas Chittenden, First Governor of Vermont”
 "Essay of Law of Contracts"
 "Memoirs of Col. Seth Warner"

References

Further reading
 "Speech of Hon. Daniel Chipman", published by E.R. Jewett, 1837.

External links  
 Biographical Directory of the United States Congress: CHIPMAN, Daniel, (1765–1850)
 The Political Graveyard: The Chipman Family
 The Political Graveyard: Chipman, Daniel (1765–1850)
 Gvtrack.us: Rep. Daniel Chipman
 

1765 births
1850 deaths
People from Salisbury, Connecticut
Dartmouth College alumni
Fellows of the American Academy of Arts and Sciences
People from Middlebury, Vermont
Members of the Vermont House of Representatives
Speakers of the Vermont House of Representatives
Burials in Vermont
Federalist Party members of the United States House of Representatives from Vermont